Dungarvan Courthouse is a judicial facility in Meagher Street, Dungarvan, County Waterford, Ireland.

History
The courthouse, which was designed by James Pain in the neoclassical style and built in ashlar stone, was completed in 1820. The design involved a symmetrical main frontage with five bays facing Meagher Street; the central section of three bays, which slightly projected forward, featured three rounded headed sash windows on the first floor flanked by pilasters supporting an entablature and a pediment.

The building was originally used as a facility for dispensing justice but, following the implementation of the Local Government (Ireland) Act 1898, which established county councils in every county, it also became the meeting place for the second and subsequent meetings of Waterford County Council. The county council established their County Secretary's Office at Arus Brugha at Davitt's Quay in the early-20th century before moving to modern Civic Offices at Davitt's Quay in 1999.

Notes

References

Buildings and structures in County Waterford
Courthouses in the Republic of Ireland
Government buildings completed in 1820
19th-century architecture in the Republic of Ireland